Peter Däppen (born 10 April 1950) is a former Swiss curler. He was an alternate on the Swiss rink that won a gold medal at the 1992 Winter Olympics when curling was a demonstration sport. Later that year, he won a bronze medal at his first appearance at the 1992 European Curling Championships.

Teams

References

External links

Living people
1950 births
Swiss male curlers

Curlers at the 1992 Winter Olympics
Olympic curlers of Switzerland

Place of birth missing (living people)
20th-century Swiss people